Sir Philip Whistler Street,  (9 August 1863 – 11 September 1938) was the 8th Chief Justice of the Supreme Court of New South Wales and Lieutenant-Governor of New South Wales. He was the first member of the Street family to attain these viceregal offices, which were later held by his son Sir Kenneth Whistler Street and grandson Sir Laurence Whistler Street.

He was the first wholly Australian-trained lawyer to be appointed as Chief Justice of Australia's first Supreme Court, and the second longest serving Chief Justice of that Supreme Court. His son Sir Kenneth's accession to the Supreme Court of New South Wales while he was Chief Justice made the only Australian case of a father and son presiding over the same Supreme Court.

Early years
Street was born in Sydney, New South Wales, on 9 August 1863, the second son of John Rendell Street and Susanna Caroline (née Lawson). His father was a member of the New South Wales Legislative Assembly from 1887 to 1891 and his mother was the daughter of William Lawson, one of the three explorers who made the first settler crossing of the Blue Mountains in 1813.

Street attended Sydney Grammar School and Sydney Law School. He obtained a bachelor's degree in 1883 and was admitted to the New South Wales Bar Association on 25 August 1886. He married Belinda Maud Poolman at St John's Anglican Church in Toorak, Melbourne, on 1 February 1888. On 24 July 1906, he was appointed a judge of the Supreme Court of New South Wales.

Early career
Street was made a full judge of the Supreme Court on 11 February 1907 following the resignation of Justice W. G. Walker in February of that year. Street principally presided in bankruptcy, divorce and probate cases. He was also deputy president of the now abolished Court of Arbitration, which dealt with industrial disputes between employer and employee, as well as setting minimum wage standards in the state. Street also sat in the now abolished Vice-Admiralty Court, first established in New South Wales during the time of Governor Arthur Phillip to deal with maritime disputes. In 1915, one of his sons, Lieutenant Lawrence Whistler Street, was killed in action at Gallipoli serving in the First World War. Lawrence had volunteered for military service in August 1914, making him one of the earliest of his generation to do so.

In 1918, Street was appointed the Chief Judge in Equity. He was the first wholly Australian-trained lawyer to become Chief Justice of Australia's first Supreme Court. Street was also appointed a Royal Commissioner on many occasions. The most significant of these were concerning the administration of the Returned Soldiers' Settlement Branch of the Department of Lands in 1921 and the case against the Industrial Workers of the World (IWW) in 1918. In the latter commission, IWW was an organisation that promoted the concept of one big union. In Australia, they were active in campaigning against World War I. One campaign led to a police officer being shot and killed for which two members were found guilty and hanged.

Later career

Street's elder son Kenneth became a judge of the Supreme Court of New South Wales while he was himself. According to Percival Serle, this may be the first time a father and son have sat on the same Supreme Court bench together. Street became acting Chief Justice in 1924 and on 28 January 1925, he became Chief Justice proper, succeeding Sir William Cullen. Street served in that office until his 70th birthday in 1933. According to the Supreme Court, he resigned his commission although Serle notes that he actually retired. Whatever is correct, he was the second longest serving judge in New South Wales. He became Lieutenant-Governor in 1930 and administered the government in the absence of the Governor in 1934, 1935 and 1936.

Further details
Street was Chairman of Sydney Grammar School from 1912 to 1929. He was a member of the Senate of the University of Sydney from 1915 to 1934, and was deputy Chancellor in 1926. He was a trustee of the Art Gallery of New South Wales from 1923 and was its chairman from 1934 to 1938. He was also a trustee of the Australian Museum. Street was president of the New South Wales division of the Boy Scouts Association, of the Boys' Brigade, the New South Wales Home for Incurables, the St John Ambulance Association, and of the Institute of Public Administration Australia. He was patron in New South Wales of the Victoria League, English-Speaking Union, Japan-Australia Society and the Royal Zoological Society. He was in 1934 appointed American non-national member of the international commission provided for by the treaty between the United States of America and Greece. He died on 11 September 1938, and had a state funeral at St Andrew's Cathedral, Sydney.

References

Chief Justices of New South Wales
Lieutenant-Governors of New South Wales
Judges of the Supreme Court of New South Wales
Directors and Presidents of the Art Gallery of New South Wales
Industrial Workers of the World in Australia
People educated at Sydney Grammar School
1863 births
1938 deaths
Australian Knights Commander of the Order of St Michael and St George
Philip